Anton Maresch (born 8 August 1991) is an Austrian professional basketball player.  He currently plays for UBSC Graz of the Austrian Basketball Superliga.

He represented Austria‘s national basketball team at the EuroBasket 2017 qualification.

References

External links
 FIBA EuroBasket 2017 Profile
 Eurobasket.com Profile
 REAL GM Profile

1991 births
Living people
Austrian men's basketball players
CB Miraflores players
Shooting guards
Sportspeople from Graz